Van Aelst is a Dutch and Flemish surname. Notable people with the surname include:

 Evert van Aelst (1602–1657), Dutch painter
 Kees van Aelst (1916–2000), Dutch water polo player
 Nicolaus van Aelst (c.1526–1613), Flemish engraver
 Pieter Coecke van Aelst (1502–1550), Flemish painter
 Peeter van Aelst, 17th-century Dutch painter listed by Cornelis de Bie in his Het Gulden Cabinet
 Pieter van Aelst (f 1644-1654), Flemish painter
 Pieter van Aelst III (c. 1495 – c. 1560), Flemish tapestry weaver
 Willem van Aelst (1627–c.1683), Dutch painter

Dutch-language surnames
Surnames of Dutch origin